Rafael Nicolás Llorente Sanz (born 6 December 2002) is a Spanish professional footballer who plays as a winger for Real Madrid Castilla.

Career statistics

Club

References

External links 

 Real Madrid profile
 
 
 

2002 births
Living people
Footballers from Madrid
Spanish footballers
Association football midfielders
Real Madrid Castilla footballers
Segunda División B players
Segunda Federación players
Primera Federación players